Percina kusha, the bridled darter, is a species of freshwater ray-finned fish, a darter from the subfamily Etheostomatinae, part of the family Percidae, which also contains the perches, ruffes and pikeperches.  It is one of the 324 fish species found in Tennessee.

Geographic distribution
Found in the Coosa River in Georgia and Tennessee, the upper reaches of the Conasauga River, and in the Etowah River.

Ecology
The Bridled darter is a small freshwater fish only found in southern states. They prefer a habitat in flowing pools and riffles in smaller rivers with structures such as submerged logs and aquatic vegetation. They are typically found places with good water quality, and gravel or sandy substrates. Only being identified in Georgia and Tennessee, they naturally occur in low abundance.

Reproduction and history
Spawning season ranges from mid April to June with water temperatures of 14-21 degrees Celsius. Competitive behavior has been exhibited by males during this season, where larger ones chase off smaller, weaker males. The eggs typically experience an incubation period of about a week. The bridled darter has a short life span of around 3 years. They have been considered endangered before, but are now believed to be vulnerable.

Characteristics 
A distinct stripe that is continuous from the front to behind the snout looks like a horse's bridle, hence where this species got their name. Percina kusha lack bright colors, and males and females are similar in looks. Males are a more dusky color than females. This species has a series of overlapping circular, dark blotches along both sides. They reach a maximum of 3 inches. They are found closer to the surface because they retain a swim bladder. Their diet consists of small invertebrates such as mayfly nymphs and blackfly larvae. They have been observed feeding off submerged surfaces and strategically waiting for food to get washed downstream.

References

kusha
Fish described in 2007